Kaizoku-Ban is a live EP by German heavy metal band Accept. It was recorded in Nagoya, Japan, on 19 September 1985, and released on vinyl the same year. It was later re-released as Live in Japan in 1992. Though this is an official release, the title (海賊版) translates as "Pirate Edition" or "Bootleg". The cassette tape version of this release had the unusual feature of having all six songs recorded on both sides. Because of the duration of the six songs, it was feasible to release it this way. All six songs are available as bonus tracks on the 2002 BMG remasters of Balls to the Wall, Metal Heart, and Russian Roulette.

Track listing
Music and lyrics by Accept and Deaffy.

Credits
Band members
Udo Dirkschneider – vocals
Wolf Hoffmann – guitars
Jörg Fischer – guitars
Peter Baltes – bass guitar
Stefan Kaufmann – drums

Production
Mikio Takamatsu – sound engineer
Bobby Cohen – mixing

Charts

References

1985 EPs
Accept (band) albums
Live EPs
RCA Records EPs